The 1983 NCAA Division III women's basketball tournament was the second annual tournament hosted by the NCAA to determine the national champion of Division III women's collegiate basketball in the United States.

North Central (IL) defeated defending champions Elizabethtown in the championship game, 83–71, to claim the Cardinals' first Division III national title.

The championship rounds were hosted at Clark University in Worcester, Massachusetts.

The field for the tournament doubled in size from the previous championship in 1982, increasing from 16 to 32 teams.

Bracket
First Round (Round of 32)
 Clark (MA) 85, Bridgewater St. 71
 Salem St. 59, Eastern Conn. St. 58
 Rhode Island Col. 64, Hartwick 63
 New Rochelle 80, St. Lawrence 74
 Frostburg St. 72, TCNJ 68
 Kean 68, Wooster 63
 Elizabethtown 65, Scranton 47
 Grove City 60, Susquehanna 58
 Central (IA) 78, Augustana (IL) 71
 North Central (IL) 78, Buena Vista 65
 Concordia-M’head 75, Pomona-Pitzer 60
 Minn.-Morris 89, Bishop 78
 Wis.-Whitewater 96, Simpson 70
 Wis.-La Crosse 79, St. Norbert 65
 Pitt.-Johnstown 76, Rust 70
 Knoxville 74, UNC Greensboro 71

Regional Finals (Round of sixteen)
 Clark (MA) 62, Salem St. 57
 New Rochelle 75, Rhode Island Col. 58
 Kean 79, Frostburg St. 74
 Elizabethtown 59, Grove City 55
 North Central (IL) 82, Central (IA) 79
 Minn.-Morris 69, Concordia-M’head 68
 Wis.-La Crosse 78, Wis.-Whitewater 66
 Knoxville 73, Pitt.-Johnstown 71

Elite Eight

All-tournament team
 Page Lutz, Elizabethtown (MOP)
 Kim Wallner, North Central (IL)
 Brenda Sanders, North Central (IL)
 Judy Hodge, Clark (MA)
 Jackie Moore, Knoxville

See also
 NCAA Women's Division III Basketball Championship
 1983 NCAA Division I women's basketball tournament
 1983 NCAA Division II women's basketball tournament
 1983 NCAA Division III men's basketball tournament
 NAIA Women's Basketball Championships

References

 
NCAA Division III women's basketball tournament
1983 in sports in Massachusetts